Amblypodia anita, the purple leaf blue or leaf blue, is a lycaenid or blue butterfly found in South Asia and Southeast Asia, including Sri Lanka, India, Myanmar, Malaysia, and  Java. The species was first described by William Chapman Hewitson in 1862.

Description

References

Amblypodia
Fauna of Pakistan
Butterflies of Asia
Taxa named by Frederic Moore